Tarun Gogoi constituted his ministry for the 3rd time on 30 May 2011. He had previously been Chief Minister from 2001. Following the 2011 Assam Legislative Assembly election, Gogoi became Chief Minister for the third time as he had formed his first and second ministries previously. There were 17 congress ministers and 1 BPF minister. The cabinet had 18 members, with 13 cabinet ministers and 4 ministers of state with independent charge.

Gogoi was sworn in on 18 May 2011. Governor Janaki Ballabh Patnaik administered him the oath of office and secrecy at Raj Bhavan. Among those named in attendance were Union Minister for Development of North Eastern Region Bijoy Krishna Handique, Meghalaya Chief Minister Mukul Sangma, Chief Justice of the Gauhati High Court Madan Bhimarao Lokur, Assam Pradesh Congress Committee president Bhubaneswar Kalita and senior party leaders, the newly elected legislators of the Congress and the Bodoland People's Front, and Bodoland Territorial Council chief and BPF president Hagrama Mohilary attended the function.

Gogoi dropped 8 ministers from the previous ministry including former chief minister Bhumidhar Barman. Gogoi retained Prithibi Majhi, Gautam Roy, Ajanta Neog, Akon Bora, Himanta Biswa Sarma, Khorsing Engti, Nazrul Islam, Pradyut Bordoloi and Rakibul Hussain along with BPF representative Chandan Brahma. On 27 May 2011, Governor Janaki Ballabh Patnaik administered the oath of office to the council of ministers at the ITA culture cente, eight days after Gogoi was sworn in. Prithibi Majhi was the first to take the oath followed by former Speaker Tanka Bahadur Rai, and then former ministers Gautam Roy, Ajanta Neog and Akon Bora. They were followed by Ardhendu Kumar Dey, who was a former minister in the Hiteswar Saikia government, and the BPF minister Chandan Brahma. He allocated the portfolios to his ministers on 30 May 2011.

There was a cabinet reshuffle on 22 January 2015.

Ministers (30 May 2011 - 19 January 2015)

Ministers (22 January 2015 - 24 May 2016) 
Ahead of a cabinet reshuffle, all ministers resigned on 19 January 2015. Gogoi made the cabinet shuffle on 22 January 2015, with 14 ministers being sworn in. Only 6 previous ministers were inducted into the new ministry.

Notes

References 

Assam ministries
Indian National Congress state ministries
Indian National Congress
Bodoland People's Front
2011 in Indian politics
Cabinets established in 2011